Below is an incomplete list of those who have served as Master of the Horse to British royal consorts.

After the death of William IV in 1837, the post was discontinued.

Masters of the Horse to Philip II of Spain (1554–1558)
1554–1558: Anthony Browne, 1st Viscount Montagu

Masters of the Horse to Anne of Denmark (1603–1619)
1603–1619: Hon. Thomas Somerset

Masters of the Horse to Queen Henrietta Maria (1625–1669)
1639-?: Henry Jermyn, 1st Baron Jermyn
1663-1669: Henry Arundell, 3rd Baron Arundell of Wardour

Masters of the Horse to Queen Catherine (1662–1685)
1662-1664: Hon. Edward Montagu
1665–1678: Ralph Montagu, 3rd Baron Montagu
1679–1680: Louis de Duras, 2nd Earl of Feversham
1680–1682: Richard Lumley, 2nd Viscount Lumley (Earl of Scarbrough from 1681)
1682–1685: Robert Shirley, 1st Earl Ferrers

Masters of the Horse to Prince George of Denmark (1683–1708)
1685–1690: Edward Hyde, Viscount Cornbury
1690–1694: Edward Montagu, 3rd Earl of Sandwich
1694–1697: Basil Feilding, 4th Earl of Denbigh
1694–1705: Edward Montagu, 3rd Earl of Sandwich
1705–1708: Scroop Egerton, 4th Earl of Bridgewater

Masters of the Horse to Queen Caroline (1727–1737)
1727: Charles Beauclerk, 2nd Duke of St Albans
1727–1737: Thomas Fermor, 1st Earl of Pomfret

Masters of the Horse to Queen Charlotte (1761–1818)
1761–1763: Simon Harcourt, 1st Earl Harcourt
1763–1765: Thomas Thynne, 3rd Viscount Weymouth
1765–1766: Peregrine Bertie, 3rd Duke of Ancaster and Kesteven
1766–1768: John West, 2nd Earl De La Warr
1768–1770: Henry Somerset, 5th Duke of Beaufort
1770–1784: John Waldegrave, 3rd Earl Waldegrave
1784–1789: George Waldegrave, 4th Earl Waldegrave
1789–1791: Vacant
1791–1809: George Harcourt, 2nd Earl Harcourt
1809–1818: William Harcourt, 3rd Earl Harcourt

Masters of the Horse to Queen Adelaide (1830–1837)
1830–1834: William Hay, 18th Earl of Erroll
1834–1837: William Feilding, 7th Earl of Denbigh

References

Positions within the British Royal Household
Lists of office-holders in the United Kingdom